The Justice Juanita Kidd Stout Center for Criminal Justice (formerly the Criminal Justice Center or CJC), is a courthouse in Philadelphia, Pennsylvania. It is the main criminal courthouse of the First Judicial District of Pennsylvania (which comprises Philadelphia), housing the Criminal Section of the Philadelphia Court of Common Pleas and the Criminal Division of the Philadelphia Municipal Court. The CCJ is a 17-story steel-framed building completed in 1994 in order to alleviate pressure from courtrooms located in Philadelphia City Hall. The center is located at 1301 Filbert Street.

In May 2012, the Criminal Justice Center was renamed in honor of the late Justice Juanita Kidd Stout.

See also 
 Philadelphia City Hall (the main civil courthouse of the First Judicial District)
 List of state and county courthouses in Pennsylvania

References

External links 
 Center for Criminal Justice's technical specifications
 Architectural overview of the CCJ

Government of Philadelphia
Philadelphia
Buildings and structures in Philadelphia